Surfmen was the terminology used to describe members of the United States Lifesaving Service.  It is also currently the highest qualification in the United States Coast Guard for small boat operations. Coast Guard Surfmen are rated to operate the 47-foot Motor Lifeboat in its most extreme operating conditions after undergoing training at the National Motor Lifeboat School.

List of Surf Stations
The Surf Station designation is reserved for locations where wave conditions exceed  for 36 days or more per year.

See also
 Rasmus Midgett
 Surfman Badge

References

External links
Becoming a Surfman in 1938

United States Coast Guard job titles
United States Life-Saving Service